Azimut Hotels is a privately held Russian company that manages an international hotel chain. By mid-2021, it operated 40 hotels in Russia and Europe. According to Hotels Magazine, in 2015 the company was among the largest hotel networks worldwide. From 2008 to 2013 the company engaged in several significant acquisitions, partnerships and hotel purchases that significantly increased their overall number of properties.

Overview 

The hotels are located in Russia, Germany, Austria, and Israel. Some of them are of private ownership, and some are based on a management contract or long-term lease contracts. The company was established in 2004 by Alexander Klyachin. In 2015, the hotel chain consisted of 24 hotels of the category 3 and 4 stars; the total number of Azimut rooms is about 8 thousand.

The hotel chain was rated in 2015 as amongst the largest hotel networks worldwide, according to Hotels Magazine.

As of 2018, the hotel chain counts 29 properties across three countries.

History 

In 2004, Alexander Klyachin acquired his first hotels in Samara, Kostroma and Ufa. In 2005, the hotel chain expanded with hotels in Saint Petersburg, Vladivostok, Astrakhan and Murmansk.

In 2007, the company has become one of the largest hotel chains in Russia: its turnover amounted to 54 million US dollars with an annual growth rate of 30%.

In 2008, the hotels in Germany and Austria were acquired and control over the assets was transferred through management contracts and franchise agreements (for a period of 20–25 years). The European office was located in Berlin.

In 2010, the hotel chain acquired hotels in Novosibirsk, and took over the management contract Voronezh.

In 2011, the hotel chain acquired a hotel in Nizhny Novgorod. As at the end of 2012, the company's revenue amounted to 3.5 billion rubles.

Since 2013, the company has controlled the largest hotel complex in Sochi. The Azimut Hotel Sochi was opened in anticipation of the 2014 Winter Olympics in Sochi.

At the end of 2013, the hotel chain also acquired the 487 room Azimut Moscow Olympic Hotel, which was renamed from the "Olympic Penta".

In April 2015, the Vienna Delta Hotel joined Azimut Hotels chain.

In May 2015, Azimut Hotel Vladivostok, the biggest investment project in the Russians Far East in 2014-2015 and the first SMART hotel in the region, opened after renovation. With 378 modern rooms, it is also the largest hotel in the area. Investment in this project exceeded €20 million.

In 2015, Azimut Hotels started cooperation with the countries of Asia-Pacific region. The first step was a Service Voluntary Certification Program China Friendly, .

The Moscow Hotel 'Belgrad' was bought by the Azimut Hotel chain in 2014. The hotel was closed for renovation in 2016. The hotel was projected in 2016 to be reopened as Azimut Moscow Smolenskaya Hotel.

History of Hotels under brand Azimut

Business model

Renovation of Soviet hotels 

In Russia, the business model of Azimut Hotels is based on the reconstruction and modernization of hotels built during the Soviet period. For example, it renovated the hotel National in Samara, which was renamed Azimut Hotel Samara since 2006 and is on renovation since 2014. There has been also the modernization of hotels in Ufa, Kostroma, St. Petersburg, Vladivostok and other Russian cities.

SMART concept 

Azimut Hotels developed SMART concept for the hotel rooms. The main idea of the concept is combination of a minimal design in the classic German school of thought, multifunctional furniture and ergonomics. The color scheme of the SMART spaces includes berry tones with darker wood floors and warm eclectic lighting.

China Friendly 

The company joined  China Friendly to create a comfortable environment for Chinese tourists. Special conditions for travellers from China include Chinese-speaking staff, Chinese breakfast, information materials and website in Chinese. The first hotels to join the program were Azimut Moscow Olympic Hotel and Azimut Hotel Vladivostok.

Ownership and management 

The main shareholder and chairman of the board of directors is Alexander Klyachin. He also has owned since August 2012 the Hotel Metropol Moscow and development company KR Properties.

Since November 2013, the company is headed by Walter Neumann who previously worked for Rocco Forte Hotels as a Director of the St. Petersburg hotels Astoria and Angleterre.

See also

References

Bibliography

External links

Official website

Travel and holiday companies of Russia
Hotel chains
Companies based in Moscow
Russian companies established in 2004